Cédric D'Ulivo (born 29 August 1989) is a French footballer who is currently playing for US Marseille Endoume in the Championnat National 3.

References

External links
 

1989 births
Living people
French footballers
Belgian Pro League players
Challenger Pro League players
Úrvalsdeild karla (football) players
Olympique de Marseille players
SO Cassis Carnoux players
AC Ajaccio players
S.K. Beveren players
S.V. Zulte Waregem players
Oud-Heverlee Leuven players
Fimleikafélag Hafnarfjarðar players
US Marseille Endoume players
French expatriate footballers
Expatriate footballers in Belgium
Expatriate footballers in Iceland
Association football defenders